Aloha Jewish Chapel was built in 1975 on the grounds of what is now Joint Base Pearl Harbor–Hickam in Honolulu, Hawaii.  It was designed by Vladimir Ossipoff as the first building built by the United States government exclusively for Jewish worship. (The Commodore Levy Chapel, Naval Station Norfolk, is the Navy's oldest Jewish Chapel, but it is part of a larger Chapel complex.)  The Aloha Jewish Chapel was dedicated on December 14, 1975 by Rear Admiral Bertram Wallace Korn, who was, at the time, the highest ranking rabbi in the United States military.

The chapel has a vaulted roof with an adjacent mikveh (ritual bath).  The building also contains a kitchen for kosher food, a library, and a small social hall.  On the exterior of the building is the "Shalom" sculpture created in 1975 by Selma Mannheim of Los Angeles, California.  With its copious natural light, the building is considered a prime example of Hawaii Modern architecture.

The congregation raised money for, and purchased, a new Torah scroll, which was dedicated on October 26, 2008.  This was the first dedication of a new Torah scroll in the State of Hawaii.

Visitor information
The Chapel (Building 1514) is located just inside the Makalapa Gate. Shabbat services are held at 7:30 P.M. on Fridays and at 8:15 A.M. on Saturdays.  Torah study is held at 6:30 P.M. on Mondays.  Unless prior arrangements are made, those attending services must have, or be accompanied onto the base by someone having, a military identification card.

References

External links
Aloha Jewish Chapel

Synagogues in Hawaii
Religious buildings and structures in Honolulu
Military chapels of the United States
Jewish-American military history
Unaffiliated synagogues in the United States
Synagogues completed in 1975
1975 establishments in Hawaii
Military facilities in Hawaii